Kim Jin-kyung (born March 3, 1997) is a South Korean model and actress. In 2012, she participated in OnStyle's Korea's Next Top Model, becoming the runner up. She made her acting debut in 2016, with the web-drama Yellow.

Filmography

Variety shows

Television series

Web series

Awards and nominations

References

Living people
1997 births
South Korean television personalities
South Korean television actresses
Hanlim Multi Art School alumni
Top Model finalists